Duke Xiao of Chen (reigned 10th century BC), given name Tu (突), was the fourth ruler of the ancient Chinese state of Chen during the Western Zhou dynasty. Xiao was his posthumous name. He was the grandson of the state's founder Duke Hu of Chen, who married the eldest daughter of King Wu of Zhou.

Duke Xiao was the son of Duke Shēn of Chen (陳申公), the second ruler of Chen. When Duke Shēn died, the throne passed to his younger brother Gaoyang, Duke Xiang of Chen, instead of his son Tu. However, Duke Xiao ascended the throne after the death of his uncle Duke Xiang. Duke Xiao was succeeded by his son Yurong, known as Duke Shèn of Chen (陳慎公).

References

Bibliography

Monarchs of Chen (state)
10th-century BC Chinese monarchs